Periyanaickenpalayam Railway station is a suburban railway station in Coimbatore.

History
The station is one of the oldest in the state, built in 1873. It was renovated in 2016/2017 at a cost of ₹ 2 crore under the Corporate Social Responsibility (CSR) of Laksmi Machine Works (LMW).
Having been in existence for more than 140 years, the station played a significant role in the development of the locality. Currently, on average more than 1,000 passengers make use of this station to travel between Coimbatore and Mettupalayam on daily basis. Being located close to Lakshmi Machine Works it is frequently used by the company employees. The station was last renovated in 1986 and the number of train services was gradually increased in the years that followed. LMW under its CSR initiative has taken up the renovation work of the Periyanaickenpalayam Railway Station in 2016 and was completed in June 2017. The renovation includes construction of the station building with facilities such as waiting area, ramps, separate differently-abled friendly toilets, ticket counter-cum-station master room, fencing of the station area and gardening. As a part of LMW's environment greening initiative, 135 native tree sapling varieties have been planted on the station premises and also in the surrounding areas to increase the green cover and ambiance of the station.

References

Railway stations in Coimbatore